Kenton High School may refer to:

Kenton School, Newcastle upon Tyne, England
Kenton High School (Kenton, Ohio), U.S.

See also
Simon Kenton High School, Independence, Kentucky, U.S.